The Council of Tarragona was two distinct Council of the Roman Catholic Church held in the city of Tarragona, in Catalonia, Spain.

First Council at Tarragon 
The Council of Tarragona was held by Archbishop John of Tarragona, on 6 November 516. This council assembled all the bishops of his province, thus becoming the first provincial council of Tarragona. There were ten bishops were present. In 517 he assembled another provincial council in Girona.

References

History of Catalonia
Tarragona
Tarragona
Tarragona